The Samsung Galaxy J2 (2018) (also known as Galaxy J2 Pro (2018) or Galaxy Grand Prime Pro) is an Android smartphone manufactured by Samsung Electronics. It was unveiled and released in January 2018.

Specifications

Hardware 
The Galaxy J2 is powered by an Snapdragon 425 SoC including a quad-core 1.4 GHz ARM Cortex-A53 CPU, an Adreno 308 GPU with either 1.5 (Pro) or 2 GB RAM. The 16 GB internal storage can be upgraded up to 256 GB via microSD card.

It has a 5.0-inch Super AMOLED display with a 540×960 px resolution. The J2 (2018) features an 8megapixels with f/2.2 aperture, LED flash, autofocus and HDR; the front camera has 5 MP with f/2.2 aperture.

Software 
The Galaxy J2 is originally shipped with Android 7.1.1"Nougat" and Current to 8.1 "Oreo" (for 2 GB RAM) only.

See also 
 Samsung Galaxy
 Samsung Galaxy J series

References 

Android (operating system) devices
Samsung smartphones
Mobile phones introduced in 2018
Samsung Galaxy
Discontinued smartphones
Mobile phones with user-replaceable battery